John Ngata Kariuki is a Kenyan politician and businessman.  He has two children: James Kariuki (husband to Alison Ngethe Kariuki and Dr. Elizabeth Nyawira. His grandchildren are Robyn Kariuki, Lauryn and Colin. His wife, Rose Wanjiku Kariuki (educationalist and economist), died in 2015.

He is the Chairman of Sarova Hotels. In 2000, he founded the Ngata Children's Home in Kirinyaga 

At the 2007 parliamentary elections, he won the Kirinyaga Central Constituency parliamentary seat on FORD-Asili ticket.

However, he lost the seat for Kirinyaga central after a court petition filed by Daniel Karaba (Narc-Kenya). Kariuki decided not to defend his seat at the subsequent by-election, where Karaba lost to the PNU candidate Joseph Gitari.

He has served as Non-Executive Chairman and Director in several companies including Kenya Airways, Kenya National Assurance, the Automobile Association of Kenya, the Kenya Post & Telecommunications Corporation (Telkom Kenya) and as a member of the Advisory Committee of the Bank of India.

Kariuki is the second son of Japhet Kariuki Kanyotu.  His elder brother is the late James Kanyotu (Kenya's first Director of Intelligence), and he is followed by another brother, David Nderu (a well known industrialist). He has two sisters and three other brothers.

References 

Members of the National Assembly (Kenya)
Kenyan businesspeople
Living people
Year of birth missing (living people)
Members of the 10th Parliament of Kenya